Irshad is a popular name among Islam religion, people with the name :

Irshad (company), Electronic company in Azerbaijan
Irshad Kamil, an Indian Hindi/Urdu poet and lyricist
Irshad (actor), Indian actor of Malayalam films
Irshad Ali, Pakistan's shooter
Irshad Manji, Canadian author, educator at New York University, and advocate of a "reformist" interpretation of Islam
Irshad Khan, surbahar and sitar player based in Canada
Irshad Ashraf, British documentary film maker
Irshad Panjatan, Indian actor and veteran mime artist